Bennett Springs is a northeastern suburb of Perth, Western Australia, located in the City of Swan. Formed from parts of the suburbs of Beechboro, Whiteman and West Swan, Originally a subdivision from Beechboro up until 2011 when it was gazetted in April 2011 after a year-long campaign by residents to rename the suburb Bennett Springs. The suburb was named after Matilda Bennett, the wife of John Septimus Roe.

The suburb is part of the City of Swan's Urban Growth Corridor and is bounded by Lord Street to the east, Reid Highway to the south, Tonkin Highway to the west and Marshall Road and the former boundary of West Swan to the north. Bennett Brook, also named after Matilda Bennett, runs through part of the suburb.

Areas of the suburb

Bennett Springs – Bennett Springs is a long rectangular chunk of land sandwiched between Reid Highway and Marshall Road, bounded by Bennett Brook on the east and Beechboro Road North on the west. Released from the late 1990s construction began on the east side of the estate making its way to the west and still being developed today, Bennett Springs consists almost entirely of brick and tile 4x2s. Exceptions include occasional two-storey homes, a few 5x2s and a smattering of original dwellings built before the subdivision occurred. Like Orchid Park, the powerlines of Marshall Road are obvious from the northern part of Bennett Springs; in fact selected blocks along Wintergreene, Turnstone, Portland, Driftwood and Oriole Roads actually go underneath the lines.  The long-awaited Springs shopping center has greatly increased the amenity of the subdivision. Beechboro Christian School is also located in the suburb. Birds are the theme for Bennett Springs street names with names such as Fairywren, Whimbrel and Spoonbill. This area also has many parks, and exclusively multiple water fountains running 24/7 which contributes to the name: "Bennett Springs" Orchid park contains 2 parks while Bennett Springs contains 8 including a major sports field (with football pitch, Australian football field, basketball field, all of whom are covered by solar lights)

Orchid Park is a pocket of houses to the northwest. It has one access road being the roundabout turnoff into Orchid Avenue off Beechboro Road North. Orchid Park housing was constructed from around 1989 to 1995, and consists of brick and tile 3x1s and 4x2s. Historically this subdivision was not popular due to its remote location and lack of nearby amenities; however, the recent construction of a shopping centre (Bennett Springs Shopping Centre) opposite the entrance roundabout has changed this. The street names of Orchid Park are named after various types and parts of orchid flowers, such as Niltonia, Denia and Stylis. The Marshall Road powerlines are prominently visible along the boundary of Orchid Park, backing onto parts of Mitra Loop and Orchid Avenue. Orchid Park is now very popular with close proximity to Malaga which has many shops including JB Hi-Fi, Harvey Norman, Bunnings, Beacon, The Good Guys, Perth Ice Arena and the popular indoor market Malaga Markets.

Bennett Springs East - Bennett Springs East is a new subdivision of Bennett Springs bounded by Lord Street to the east, Bennett Brook to the west, Marshall Road to the north and Reid Highway to the south. Construction began 2017 and is currently still being developed.

References

Suburbs of Perth, Western Australia
2011 establishments in Australia
Suburbs and localities in the City of Swan